The women's 4x400 metres relay event at the 2000 World Junior Championships in Athletics was held in Santiago, Chile, at Estadio Nacional Julio Martínez Prádanos on 21 and 22 October.

Medalists

Results

Final
22 October

Heats
21 October

Heat 1

Heat 2

Participation
According to an unofficial count, 45 athletes from 10 countries participated in the event.

References

4 x 400 metres relay
Relays at the World Athletics U20 Championships